Mézel is a commune in the Alpes-de-Haute-Provence department in southeastern France.

Geography
The village lies on the right bank of the Asse, which forms all of the communes eastern border.

Population

See also
Communes of the Alpes-de-Haute-Provence department

References

Communes of Alpes-de-Haute-Provence
Alpes-de-Haute-Provence communes articles needing translation from French Wikipedia